Acklom is a surname. Notable people by that name include:

 Cecil Ryther Acklom (1872–1937), British officer in the Royal Navy
 Esther Acklom (1788–1818), British heiress
 George Moreby Acklom (1870–1959), British writer, editor, and critic based in New York City
 Mark Acklom (born 1973), English conman and fraudster